is a Japanese curler from Kitami.

Personal life
Tanida is employed as an agricultural machinery mechanic for Hokkaido Kubota.

Teams and events

Men's

Mixed doubles

References

External links

 Team official website 
 Yasumasa Tanida profile -- Team official website 
 Athlete profile - 2015 Winter Universiade - FISU
 Yasumasa Tanida profile -- Curling World Cup

1994 births
Living people
Japanese male curlers
Pacific-Asian curling champions
People from Nayoro, Hokkaido
Sportspeople from Hokkaido
People from Kitami, Hokkaido